Maclean-Hunter (M-H) was a Canadian communications company, which had diversified holdings in radio, television, magazines, newspapers and cable television distribution.

History

The company began in 1887, when brothers John Bayne Maclean and Hugh Cameron Maclean launched their first trade publication, Canadian Grocer & General Storekeeper. Hugh left the company in 1899 and later return to Toronto to establish his own publication firm. John subsequently expanded his company into other areas of publishing, launching the general interest magazine Maclean's in 1905, the business newspaper Financial Post in 1907, the lifestyle magazine Canadian Homes and Gardens in 1925, the women's magazine Chatelaine in 1928, and its French-language counterpart, Châtelaine in 1960.

Horace Talmadge Hunter joined Maclean Publishing in 1903, moving up the management ranks from general manager in 1911 to succeed John Bayne Maclean as president in 1933; in 1945 the company's name was changed to Maclean-Hunter. Hunter retired in 1952 and died in 1961. Hunter's son Donald Fleming later became president and chairman of M-H.

In 1961, the company began to diversify, adding its first broadcasting asset, radio station CFCO in Chatham, Ontario. In 1968 Maclean-Hunter Publishing Company Limited was renamed to Maclean-Hunter Limited and finally as Maclean Hunter Limited in 1981.

In the 1970s, M-H merged its Le Maclean French-language magazine with Actualité, and began publishing L'actualité. In 1982, the company acquired a controlling interest in Sun Media; ownership of the Financial Post was transferred to Sun Media in 1987 to facilitate the publication's expansion from a weekly to a daily newspaper.

By the early 1990s, Maclean-Hunter's assets also included cable television services in 35 Ontario markets, 21 radio stations, television station CFCN in Calgary and a significant minority share in CTV.

Maclean-Hunter was acquired in 1994 by Rogers Communications. The Canadian Radio-television and Telecommunications Commission approved the transaction, but required Rogers to divest itself of some of Maclean-Hunter's individual assets to alleviate concerns about concentration of media ownership. Shaw Communications acquired some of the cable holdings and radio stations, Telemedia and Blackburn Radio acquired other radio stations, and the consortium of Baton Broadcasting and Electrohome acquired CFCN and the CTV shares. Sun Media was sold in an employee buyout in 1996.

Maclean-Hunter also had cable holdings in the United States, which were acquired by Comcast in 1994.

Maclean-Hunter lives on in the publication Maclean's magazine.

In 2016 L'Actualité. was sold to Mishmash (XPND Capital).

The former assets of Maclean-Hunter were sold by Rogers to St. Joseph Communications in March 2019.

Operations
Maclean-Hunter's main office was at College Park from the 1980s until its acquisition by Rogers in 1994. Its previous head office was in a series of buildings along the corner of Dundas Street and University Avenue. Maclean's magazine moved to Rogers Communications premises at 1 Mount Pleasant Road (Rogers Building) and remained there until it was sold to St. Joseph Communications.

In 1948, M-H moved their printing plant at 210 Dundas Street West to North York (Highway 401-Yonge Street). The large plant was built near the home of Robert Earl Bales, Reeve of North York. The plant was sold and demolished in 2001 for re-development as "Mansions of Avondale" condominiums and Avondale Park. Macleans along with other Rogers Media print publications are now printed by Transcontinental.

Presidents

 John Bayne Maclean — 1887-1933
 Horace Talmadge Hunter — 1933-1952
 Floyd Chalmers — 1952-1964 - chairman 1964-1969
 Donald Fleming Hunter — 1964-1976 - later as chairman
 Frederick T. Metcalf — 1977-1984 - later as chairman
 Donald Graham Campbell — 1984-1986
 Ronald Osborne — 1986-1994

Assets
At the time of Maclean-Hunter's takeover by Rogers in 1994, the company owned the following assets:

Television
Rogers immediately spun off Maclean-Hunter's television assets. Baton Broadcasting and Electrohome acquired CFCN-TV and Maclean-Hunter's share of CTV, a transaction which moved Baton significantly closer to its eventual takeover of the entire CTV network. Shaw acquired Maclean-Hunter's share in the New Country Network, which was licensed but had not yet launched at the time of the takeover.

 Calgary - CFCN-TV
 14.3% of CTV
 60% of New Country Network

Radio
Maclean-Hunter owned 21 radio stations. Most were spun off by Rogers to other owners; only the Kitchener and Ottawa stations are still owned by Rogers today.

 Amherst - CKDH
 Brampton - CFNY
 Campbellton - CKNB
 Charlottetown - CFCY, CHLQ
 Chatham - CFCO
 Halifax - CHNS, CHFX
 Kitchener - CKGL, CHYM
 Leamington - CHYR
 Moncton - CKCW, CFQM
 Newcastle - CFAN
 Ottawa - CIWW, CKBY
 Saint John - CIOK
 Sarnia - CKTY, CFGX
 Sussex - CJCW
 Toronto - CKYC

Cable television
Maclean-Hunter Cable served the following markets in Ontario. These were acquired by Rogers, although some were later sold to Shaw Cable or Cogeco.

 Ajax
 Alexandria
 Alfred
 Arnprior
 Beachburg
 Bourget
 Carp
 Chalk River
 Cobden
 Collingwood
 Deep River
 Guelph
 Hamilton
 Hawkesbury
 Huntsville
 Lancaster
 Limoges
 London
 Maxville
 Midland
 Niagara Falls
 North Bay
 Ottawa (west of Bank Street)
 Owen Sound
 Pakenham
 Pembroke
 Peterborough
 Renfrew
 St. Catharines
 St. Isidore de Prescott
 Sarnia
 Sault Ste. Marie
 Thunder Bay
 Toronto
 Wallaceburg

References

External links
 CRTC decision approving the acquisition of Maclean-Hunter by Rogers
 Maclean-Hunter Limited fonds, Archives of Ontario
 Maclean Hunter Limited (1887-1994) - Canadian Communications Foundation

Defunct cable and DBS companies of Canada
Radio broadcasting companies of Canada
Magazine publishing companies of Canada
Newspaper companies of Canada
Defunct broadcasting companies of Canada
Publishing companies established in 1887
Mass media companies disestablished in 1994
1887 establishments in Ontario
1994 disestablishments in Ontario
Maclean's
Rogers Communications